Taimushan railway station is a railway station located in Fuding, Ningde, Fujian Province, China, on the Wenzhou-Fuzhou Railway operated by the Nanchang Railway Bureau, China Railway Corporation.

See also 
Mount Taimu

References 

Railway stations in Fujian
Railway stations in China opened in 2009